The Vermont Catamounts women's ice hockey program represented the University of Vermont during the 2019–20 NCAA Division I women's ice hockey season.

Offseason

Recruiting

Departures

Regular season

Standings

Schedule 

|-
!colspan=12 style=""| Regular Season
|-

|-
!colspan=12 style="  "| Hockey East Tournament
|-

Roster

References

Vermont Catamounts women's ice hockey seasons